Zoltán Bezerédi (born 18 July 1955) is a Hungarian actor. He has appeared in 65 films and television shows since 1980. He starred in the 1985 film Elsö kétszáz évem, which was entered into the 36th Berlin International Film Festival.

Selected filmography
 Bizalom (1980)
 Oh, Bloody Life (1984)
 Elsö kétszáz évem (1985)
 Out of Order (1997)
 Passion (1998)
 Perlasca – Un eroe Italiano (2002)

References

External links

1955 births
Living people
Hungarian male film actors
Male actors from Budapest
20th-century Hungarian male actors